Employers, or a group of related businesses, whose total Australian wages exceed the current NSW monthly threshold are required to pay NSW payroll tax. Broadly speaking, the tax amount is a percentage of taxable wages paid within NSW. This percentage is called the payroll tax rate.

The following table lists the payroll tax rate and annual threshold in force for the indicated dates. The monthly threshold is the appropriate fraction of the annual threshold according to how many days there are in the month.

Each monthly payment or 'nil' remittance is due seven days after the end of each month, or by the next business day if the seventh day is a weekend (i.e., August payment is due by 7 September). The annual reconciliation and payment or 'nil' remittance is due by 21 July.

Effective July 2007 - In NSW, payroll tax is levied under the Payroll Tax Act 2007, and administered by the Taxation Administration Act 1996.

Prior to 1 July 2007 - In NSW, payroll tax was levied under the Payroll Tax Act 1971, and administered by the Taxation Administration Act 1996.

See also
 Taxation in Australia

External links
 Payroll Tax - Office of State Revenue 

Economy of New South Wales
State taxation in Australia
Payroll